The caramusa is a type of bagpipe played in Corsica.  It consists of a chanter and a parallel drone.

The instrument is associated with shepherds, and also was traditionally played at festivals.

Bagpipes
Corsican musical instruments